Charron Fisher (born November 15, 1985) is an American former professional basketball player.

College career
After attending Roman Catholic High School in Philadelphia, Fisher played college basketball at Niagara University. During his four-year stint with the Purple Eagles, between 2004 and 2008, he averaged 19.6 points, 7.6 rebounds, 1.1 assists and 1.1 steals per game. As a senior at Niagara, Fisher averaged 27.6 points, 9.5 rebounds, 1.2 assists and 1.7 steals per game.

Professional career
After graduating from college, Fisher moved to Serbia and played for Vojvodina Srbijagas in the 2008–09 season. After that, he spent the full 2009–10 season with Kalev/Cramo in Estonia. In 2010, Fisher signed with APOEL from Cyprus, but an injury in November left him out for the rest of the 2010–11 season. In July 2011, Fisher signed a one-year contract for AEK Larnaca. With Petrolina AEK he won the Cypriot championship in 2013 and was named league MVP.

External links
 Charron Fisher at eurobasket.com
 Charron Fisher at purpleeagles.com

1985 births
Living people
ABA League players
African-American basketball players
American expatriate basketball people in Cyprus
American expatriate basketball people in Estonia
American expatriate basketball people in Serbia
American expatriate basketball people in Lebanon
APOEL B.C. players
Basketball players from Camden, New Jersey
BC Kalev/Cramo players
KK Vojvodina Srbijagas players
Niagara Purple Eagles men's basketball players
Shooting guards
Small forwards
American men's basketball players
Korvpalli Meistriliiga players
21st-century African-American sportspeople
20th-century African-American people